Timothy Christopher Stokely (born July 1983) is a British businessman and the founder and former CEO of the internet site OnlyFans. He has been described by The Sunday Times as "the king of homemade porn".

Early life
Tim Stokely was born in Harlow, Essex, in July 1983, the youngest of four children of Guy Stokely, a retired ex-Barclays investment banker. He has a degree from Anglia Ruskin University.

Career
Stokely's first businesses were the adult performance websites GlamWorship and Customs4U, and a site to connect customers to tradespeople. He founded OnlyFans in 2016 alongside his older brother, Thomas Stokely and with the help of a £10,000 loan from his father, Guy, who told him "Tim, this is going to be the last one". His brother is the company's chief operating officer and his father is head of finance for OnlyFans. He sought to avoid the mistakes of his earlier sites by building in a referral system that gave third parties an incentive to recruit new content creators to the site.

He has been described by The Sunday Times as "the king of homemade porn" as the majority of OnlyFans' content is pornographic. Stokely cites the investor Warren Buffett and his book Warren Buffett on Business as one of his influences.

In 2018, Stokely sold a 75% stake in OnlyFans' parent company Fenix International to Leonid Radvinsky, a Ukrainian-American businessman and the owner of porn site MyFreeCams. After this, OnlyFans became increasingly focused on not safe for work (NSFW) content and "gained a pop culture reputation for being a hive of pornography".

Stokely lives in a "gated mansion with a cinema and sauna" in Bishop's Stortford, Hertfordshire. He subscribes to two OnlyFans content creators, James Haskell and Chris Robshaw, which reflects his interest in rugby.

On 23 December 2021, Tim Stokely stepped down as CEO of OnlyFans, and was succeeded by Indian-American businesswoman Amrapali Gan. Gan originally joined the company in 2020 as its chief marketing and communications officer.

References

Living people
British company founders
People from Harlow
English pornographers
Alumni of Anglia Ruskin University
1983 births
English chief executives